Tom Duffy's Circus is an Irish family-run travelling circus, headquartered in Navan, County Meath, Ireland. It is Ireland's number one circus and has one of the oldest big tops in the world, dating back to the 18th century.

History
Duffy's Circus was originally founded in 1775. The Duffy family's involvement in circuses stretches back to a young shoemaker from Dublin, Patrick James Duffy, who performed as an acrobat in circuses in the 1840s in England. He had seven children, six of them got involved in the circus. In the 1870s, Duffy's second son, John, founded the John Duffy Circus. The family toured for three seasons before family divisions caused them to split in 1917 into two separate companies. Following John Duffy's death in 1956, the circus split between his son James and his uncle. By 1961, there was one company left which took another split, for Tom Duffy's Circus to come in existence. In the late 1970s, Tom Duffy became the owner and CEO of the circus.

Duffy's son David is the current ringmaster of the circus and is run by his sons, Tom and Jamie, the sixth generation of performers from their family. Tom Duffy's Circus is Ireland's number one circus and includes acts from all over the world.

In 2018, Tom and Jamie won a Silver Clown Award at the Monte-Carlo Circus Festival in Monaco.

On 20 April 2020, owner and former ringmaster Tom Duffy tested positive for COVID-19 in his nursing home. He recovered one month later on 20 May. On 15 March 2022, it was announced that Duffy had died aged 92.

2018 Donegal circus incident
On the night of 17 April 2018, a number of people were hurt after a circus performer fell through a safety net at the circus in Donegal Town in County Donegal. During the performance, a trapeze artist fell through the safety net onto a number of people below who were watching the show. The performer, as well as one other person watching the show, were injured. They were taken to Sligo University Hospital by two ambulances called to the scene.

See also
List of circuses and circus owners

References

External links
Tom Duffy's Circus - Official Website

Irish circus performers
Circuses
Family-owned companies